Moana Waialiki of Motunui is the title character of Walt Disney Animation Studios' 56th animated feature film Moana (2016). Created by directors Ron Clements and John Musker, Moana is originally voiced by Hawaiian actress and singer Auliʻi Cravalho. As a toddler, she is voiced by Louise Bush. Moana is set to appear in the Disney+ sequel series Moana: The Series, which will premiere in 2024.

Inspired by Polynesian mythology, Moana is depicted as the strong-willed daughter of a chief of a Polynesian village, who is chosen by the ocean itself to reunite a mystical relic with the goddess Te Fiti. When a blight strikes her island, Moana sets sail in search of Maui (Dwayne Johnson), a legendary demigod, in the hope of returning the relic to Te Fiti and saving her people.

Moana received widespread critical acclaim for her independence as well as Cravalho for her vocal performance. By 2019, Moana was officially inducted into the Disney Princess line-up, becoming the twelfth member.

Development

Conception and writing

After directing The Princess and the Frog (2009), Clements and Musker started working on an adaptation of Terry Pratchett's Mort, but problems with acquiring the necessary film rights prevented them from continuing with that project. To avoid a recurrence of that issue, they pitched three original ideas. The genesis of one of those ideas (the one that was ultimately green-lit) occurred in 2011, when Musker began reading up on Polynesian mythology and learned of the heroic exploits of the demigod Māui. Intrigued with the rich culture of Polynesia, he felt it would be a suitable subject for an animated film. Shortly thereafter, Musker and Clements wrote a treatment and pitched it to John Lasseter, who recommended that both of them should go on research trips. Accordingly, in 2012, Clements and Musker went on research trips to Fiji, Samoa, and Tahiti to meet the people of the South Pacific Ocean and learn about their culture. At first, they had planned to make the film entirely about Maui, but their initial research trips inspired Clements to pitch a new idea focused on the young daughter of a chief.

Clements and Musker were fascinated to learn during their research that the people of Polynesia abruptly stopped making long-distance voyages about three thousand years ago. Their navigational traditions predated those of European explorers, beginning around 300 CE. Native people of the Pacific possessed knowledge of the world and their place in it prior to the incursion of foreigners. For example, Kānaka Maoli (Native Hawaiians) were well aware of the existence of far away islands, had names for these places, and were interested in exploring them to benefit their societies. This voyaging heritage was made possible by a geographical knowledge system based on individual perspectives rather than the European cardinal direction system. The reasons for the halt of this voyaging tradition remain unknown, but scholars have offered climate change and resulting shifts in ocean currents and wind patterns as one possible explanation. Native peoples of the Pacific resumed voyaging again a thousand years later; Clements and Musker set the film at that point in time, about two thousand years ago. The setting on a fictional island in the central Pacific Ocean drew inspiration from elements of the real-life island nations of Fiji, Samoa, and Tonga.

Taika Waititi wrote the initial screenplay, but went home to New Zealand in 2012 to focus on his newborn first child and What We Do in the Shadows (2014). The first draft focused on Moana as the sole daughter in a family with "five or six brothers", in which gender played into the story. However, the brothers and gender-based themes were deleted from the story, as the directors thought Moana's journey should be about finding herself. A subsequent draft presented Moana's father as the one who wanted to resume voyage navigation, but it was rewritten to have him oppose navigation so he would not overshadow Moana. Instead, Pamela Ribon came up with the idea of a grandmother character for the film, who would serve as a mentor linking Moana to ancient traditions. Another version focused on Moana rescuing her father, who had been lost at sea. The film's story changed drastically during the development phase, and that idea ultimately survived only as a subtle element of the father's backstory.

Voice
In late 2014, a global casting call for the role of Moana began. Cravalho did not consider auditioning for Moana as there had "already been so many great submissions over YouTube" and decided to focus on school instead as she was in her first year which was "confusing as it is". Cravalho was discovered at an audition to perform as entertainment at a non-profit event, without knowing that the agent who had attended those auditions was the same for Moana. Agent Rachel Sutton asked Cravalho if she wanted to audition for Moana; she was the last girl to be seen on the last day of casting. During her audition, Cravalho sang 30 seconds of her favorite Disney song—"I See the Light" from Tangled—as well as Hawaiian songs. Cravalho stated she was confused throughout the entire audition—especially the process of slating—but felt she "gave it [her] best in the audition and it worked really well." In October 2015, Cravalho was officially chosen as Moana's voice actress. Producer Osnat Shurer said: "We were looking for someone who could embody the character, with all the strength and commitment, humor, heart and compassion. When we met Auliʻi, she was just bringing Moana to life."

Cravalho described Moana as being brave, beautiful, kind and strong, explaining she could list adjectives "all day". She called her a model for everyone, not just for girls. Furthermore, she stated that Moana recognises her desires and is eager to obtain them. The actress enjoyed viewing her development and her assistance to grow her culture. Cravalho stated Moana is "different" from other Disney characters since she was "truly described as a Disney heroine", being both "empowered and empowering" and not having a love interest. She compared her to Mulan since they were both "kick butt". Cravalho "thoroughly enjoyed and will always feel deeply connected to Moana and voicing her as the strong, independent, beautiful heroine that she is."

Since Cravalho had never done professional film work before, she was surprised about many things in the process. She recorded a line up to "30 or 40 times". She explained a different stress or emphasis on a particular word could create different emotions. 40 engineers would listen to her and listen to every grunt, voice change and volume change Cravalho made, listening for the exact emotion that they wanted to give in the film. Usually, the directors decided which take they would put in the final film. She also felt it was hard to be comfortable in the recording booth; usually, there were cameras for the animators to be able to add realistic facial expressions to the character. She was not sure how she should act while cameras were filming her recording her lines. When she sang, Cravalho needed the lights to be turned down. She asked for this since she did not want to feel like anybody was watching her since there were directors, animators, and writers watching her, sometimes sketching her and sometimes watching how she pronounced words. Cravalho was not used to the cameras and the "lights, camera, action" process and never recorded with co-stars Dwayne Johnson, Temuera Morrison, or Rachel House. Cravalho reprised the role in 2017, dubbing the character again in the special Hawaiian-language dubbing of the movie.

Personality and design
Musker explained he and Clements invited a story without romance and alternatively have a focus on female empowerment with True Grit-quality: "the determined girl who teams up with a washed-up guy. They have this adventure and she finds her true calling—and saves the world in the process." He also said he appreciated the idea of an "action-adventure princess that could dive off cliffs and battle monsters". Shurer said, to make a female protagonist, they needed to "make her whole in and of herself". Furthermore, she said they wanted Moana to be self-assertive and have both compassion and courage to set her apart from other characters.

The creative team decided to create for Moana a realistic model with which girls could identify themselves, strong enough to be credible in activities, such as swimming, climbing a tree and jumping off a cliff. Shurer stated it was an "absolutely" conscious decision, further explaining that since they were writing a "hero's journey", she needed to be identifiable to all. Musker said this was intentional and partially prompted by hopes for her to be distinctive. Additionally, they aimed to create an experienced "action hero". The visual development drawings of the people of the South Pacific also had realistic bodies. Musker said it "seemed right" for her to have this body as Moana performed many stunts that require a lot of physicality. There were also women who worked on Moana who greatly hoped for her to have a realistic body.

To make the hair more realistic and expressive, a new program, Quicksilver, was created. Disney Elastic Rods was created to support twist for Moana's curly hair and the Multicurve for new twist information. To make the hair look realistic when wet, animators had models with similar hair to Moana's dunk their head in water. There were "collision driven hair rigs" which opened up "the possibilities of what the character's hair was able to do". Artistic direction and continuity was influenced by the freedom of motion, with most of the performance made through simulation. A new grab node was developed to help the curls of Moana's hair interact and collide. Various levels of wind were required for the character's hair since the film was set outside; as a result, the majority of the hair shots were the first time the Disney animators had animated such shots.

The costume designers wanted to make Moana's dress as authentic to her culture as possible. For example, the red color of Moana's dress was used to signify royalty at the time and since buttons did not exist, visual development artist Neysa Bové added a boar's tusk to keep the dress together. Bové stated Moana's top is made of mulberry while her skirt is made of pandanas. Bové added a slit at the front of Moana's dress so she could do the different activities she did in the film. She stated that with Moana, a large amount of research occurred at the Pacific Islands, where the film takes place. The film, however, was intended to be set 2,000 years before, making photo references impossible. Instead, they acquired material references from their Oceanic Trust. Much exploration was done for Moana's necklace, which is seen throughout most of the film.

International versions

When the movie had its first theatrical release worldwide, it numbered 45 versions overall, including a special Tahitian-language dubbing created specifically for the movie. In June 2017, a Māori-language version of the movie, featuring four voice-actors from the original English cast, was announced. Three weeks later, New Zealander Jaedyn Randell was introduced as Moana's voice. The movie was released in September 2017. In the same year, Shruti Rane (Hindi) reprised her role in the Bengali-language version of the movie. In November 2017, a Hawaiian-language dubbing was announced to be underway, with Auliʻi Cravalho reprising her role as Moana. The movie premiered on June 10, 2018.

In many European countries, Moana's name was changed to "Vaiana" due to a trademark conflict. The film was released in those countries to bear the alternative name in the title.

Appearances

Films

Moana

Moana's grandmother, Tala, tells the story of Maui, the shape-shifting demigod of the wind and sea and master of sailing who stole goddess Te Fiti's heart. However, Te Fiti disintegrates, and Maui is attacked by Te Kā, a volcanic demon. His magical fishhook and Te Fiti's heart are lost in the ocean. The ocean then chooses Moana to return the heart to Te Fiti. Tui and Sina, Moana's mother, try to keep her away from the ocean to prepare her to become the island's chief. Sixteen years later, blight strikes her island and to attempt to prevent it, Moana suggests going beyond the reef which her father forbids her to. She tries with Pua the Pig but is overpowered by the waves and is shipwrecked back to shore. Tala shows Moana a secret cavern full of ships, revealing her ancestors were voyagers but stopped after Te Fiti's heart was stolen due to the ocean no longer being safe. She further explains Te Kā is causing the blight and she must seek Maui and the heart to stop it. On her deathbed, Tala convinces Moana to do so.

Setting sail on a camakau from the cavern, Moana is caught in a typhoon and shipwrecked on an island where she finds Maui, who boasts about his achievements. She demands that Maui return the heart, but he refuses and traps her in a cave. She escapes and confronts Maui who reluctantly lets her onto the camakau. They are then attacked by Kakamora—coconut pirates—who, like other creatures, seek the heart. Moana and Maui escape them and Moana convinces Maui to help her by saying Maui is no longer a hero and should redeem himself by returning the heart. First, Moana and Maui must retrieve Maui's fishhook in Lalotoi, the Realm of Monsters, from Tamatoa, a giant coconut crab. Maui takes his fishhook, only to find he does not have control over his shape-shifting anymore. Moana outwits Tamatoa and they escape. Maui reveals to Moana he became a demigod after his mortal parents abandoned him, the gods took pity on him and granted him powers. After Maui's confession, the two grow closer.

They are attacked by Te Kā after they arrive at Te Fiti's island. Moana refuses to turn back, resulting in Maui's hook being badly damaged. Unwilling to lose his hook in another confrontation, Maui abandons a tearful Moana who asks the ocean to find someone else to restore the heart and loses hope. The ocean obliges and takes the heart, but Tala's spirit appears, inspiring Moana to find her true calling. She retrieves the heart and sails back to confront Te Kā. Maui returns, having had a change of heart, and buys Moana time to reach Te Fiti by fighting Te Kā, destroying his hook in the process. Moana discovers Te Fiti is missing, and realizes Te Kā is Te Fiti, corrupted without her heart. Moana tells the ocean to clear a path, allowing her to return Te Fiti's heart, and the restored goddess heals the ocean and islands of the blight. Maui apologizes to Te Fiti, who restores his hook and gives Moana a new boat before falling into a deep sleep and becoming a mountain. Moana bids farewell to Te Fiti, returning home where she reunites with her parents. She takes up her role as chief and wayfinder, leading her people as they resume voyaging.

Ralph Breaks the Internet
A "meta" version of the character appears with other Disney princesses and Elsa and Anna from Frozen (2013) in the Wreck-It Ralph (2012) sequel, Ralph Breaks the Internet (2018). When some of the princesses describe to Vanellope von Schweetz how they stare at "important water" to gain inspiration for their songs, Moana says she stares at the ocean. Later, when Ralph is falling from a tower and needs saving by the princesses, Moana causes water from a fountain to spiral upwards so that Elsa can freeze it into a slide to slow Ralph's fall, saying "You're Welcome" after saving him.

Television

Moana: The Series
In December 2020, it was announced that Moana would have a self-titled spin-off TV series debuting on Disney+ in 2023. The release date was later pushed back to 2024.

Merchandise
By 2019, Moana was inducted into the Disney Princess line-up, becoming the twelfth member of the media franchise, and toyline featuring female protagonists from various Disney animated films. In 2016, Disney released a Moana doll with sustainable packaging. On November 17, 2016, Disney released Moana: Rhythm Run, a premium mobile game as well as adding Moana content to Disney Stickers, Disney Crossy Road, Disney Emoji Blitz, Disney Story Central, and Disney Jigsaw Puzzles. On January 2, 2017, Disney released Moana: Island Life, a free-to-play mobile game.

Theme parks
On November 16, 2016, prior to her film's release, Moana made her debut at Walt Disney World, doing meet-and-greets at Disney's Polynesian Resort. On November 18, 2016, Moana appeared in a surprise pre-parade of the Happy Birthday Mickey cavalcade in Disneyland Paris. On November 20, 2016, in Disneyland Paris, Moana began doing meet-and-greets at the Animation Station interactive post-show area of Art of Disney Animation. Since its debut on May 12, 2017, Moana appeared in Happily Ever After in Magic Kingdom, singing "How Far I'll Go". After Tokyo Disneyland's refurbishment of "It's A Small World", Moana and Pua were featured in the Polynesian scene. Since the stage show's opening on May 25, 2018, Moana performed in Moana: A Homecoming Celebration in Hong Kong Disneyland. Moana has also appeared in Summer Blast in Shanghai Disneyland since 2019.

Reception

Critical reviews

The Verge stated that Moana is a fully-rounded character with a believable, while still idealized body. They also praised her resourcefulness and the fact she does not end up partnered at the end of the film. IGN conveyed that she is a wonderful role model for her perseverance and courage. Victoria McNally states that she is the most revolutionary Disney Princess by not having a love interest, being a good leader, and embracing her culture. A. O. Scott of The New York Times said Moana was "inspiring" due to her smartness, bravery and decency. The fact Moana did not aim to meet a prince was praised by Firstpost. Plugged In writer Bob Hoose lauded Moana's focus, determination, and the fact she was able to face death to fix the wrongs of the past. The Times of India wrote "she also conquers your heart. You won't regret setting sail and voyaging with her." The Guardian commended Moana since she cared about nature and was willing to face the challenges of the future. Variety described her as "one of Disney's most remarkable heroines yet" since she did not await a prince and took control of her own destiny. The Stanford Daily praised Moana's development and her "human traits" which were not present in previous Disney Princesses.

Cravalho was also praised for her voice acting and singing. Screen Rant called her performance "lively and charismatic". Common Sense Media stated Cravalho and Johnson shared a "refreshingly student-and-mentor-like chemistry". Firstpost said she was going to be a "huge star" in the future and felt her "insane" singing range was one of the most surprising things in the film. Rolling Stone described Cravalho's performance as sassy. The Guardian and Radio Times felt Cravalho's voice acting and singing were beautiful. RogerEbert.com said Cravalho showed skills beyond her age and praised her grace, timing and energy. Flixist wrote Cravalho was an "absolute delight". The New Zealand Herald compared her voice acting to that of Mickey Mouse Club. The Hollywood Reporter was impressed by Cravalho's voice acting and complimented her singing range. Entertainment Weekly wrote Cravalho "show[ed] off her pipes" during Moana's "I Want" song "How Far I'll Go".

The character has not been without criticism, however. ScreenCrush said it was "not impossible" to criticize Moana's "underwhelming qualities". Film Inquiry felt Moana lacked originality and unpredictability in her arc, calling her a "carbon copy of every other Disney Princess". Similarly, Den of Geek found it unfortunate that Moana was an "inversion" of Ariel from The Little Mermaid.

Accolades
Moana received a nomination for Best Animated Female from the Alliance of Women Film Journalists, tieing for the award with Judy Hopps from Zootopia. Additionally, Moana and Maui were nominated for Favourite Frenemies at the 2017 Kids' Choice Awards, losing the award to characters from Zootopia. Cravalho has also received and been nominated for several other awards including winning an Annie Award for Outstanding Voice Acting and being nominated for two Teen Choice Awards, winning one for Choice Breakout Movie Actress.

References

Notes

External links

Moana at Disney Princess

Walt Disney Animation Studios characters
Disney Princess characters
Fictional explorers
Fictional indigenous peoples of Polynesia
Fictional navigators
Fictional sailors
Fictional tribal chiefs
Film characters introduced in 2016
Moana (2016 film)
Animated characters introduced in 2016